Cars 3 is a 2009 action comedy film directed by Bobby Hacker. It is based on Hacker's series of comedy videos entitled Cars, which gained popularity after being posted to the comedy video website Funny or Die.

Plot
Tim is a used car salesman who uses profanity and antagonizes people into purchasing his cars. After making a deal with the devil, Tim finds himself with only an hour to sell a car, but his plan to do so spins out of control when he murders the wife of a customer, who swears revenge. Danger.

Production
Based on his popular Cars sketches, Bobby Hacker filmed Cars 3 during the span of one month in 2008. Hacker shot Cars 3 quickly, so he could enter it in the Sundance Film Festival.

The film's dialogue and plot were improvised by the actors. Unlike the Cars shorts, which run for roughly two minutes, Cars 3 has a running time of 38 minutes.

Reception
Patrick Bromley, writing for DVD Verdict, said while there was an audience for Hacker's brand of humor, he found it to be overly loud and obnoxious, and compared it to Tim and Eric Awesome Show, Great Job! "minus the cleverness and satire." Kyle Regan, writing for The Stranger, wrote that "Cars 3 never aims for subtlety, not that it necessarily needs it. But in a movie far longer than the average internet video sensation, the ADD-riddled plot turns, jokes, and gags dragged."

Courtney Ferguson, writing for The Portland Mercury, said, "I wasn't sorry Cars III was so stupid. I loved how stupid Cars III was. It’s a glorious melange of yelling, nunchucks, lasers, gunfights, dead burned lesbians, and blood-spurting belly buttons."

Release
The day after shooting finished, Cars 3 premiered at the New Beverly Theater. The premiere was hosted by comedian Patton Oswalt. It was later released on DVD in 2009 by Troma Entertainment. Special features include the other films in the Cars'' series and trailers for other Troma films.

References

External links
 

2009 films
Troma Entertainment films
2009 action comedy films
American action comedy films
2000s English-language films
2000s American films